The following is a list of lakes in Chile.  It consists of lakes of varying types and origins but the majority of the lakes (especially those in southern Chile) are glacial in origin.  The watershed or catchment area is the geographical area of land that drains into the lake.

Lakes by area
Note: The lakes are ordered by their area within the political boundaries of Chile.

Lakes by natural region

Lakes in Norte Grande
 Chungará Lake
 Cotacota Lagoons
 Laguna de Cotacotani
 Laguna Lejía
 Quantija Lagoon
 Miscanti Lagoon

Lakes in Norte Chico
 Conchucha Lagoon
 Embalse Corrales (man-made)
 Laguna Verde 
 Tranque Puclaro (man-made)

Lakes in Zona Central
 Colbún Lake (man-made)
 Laguna del Inca
 Laguna del Laja
 Peñuelas Lake (man-made) 
 Rapel Lake (man-made)

Lakes in Zona Sur

 Budi Lake
 Caburgua Lake
 Calafquén Lake
 Chapo Lake
 Colico Lake
 Conguillio Lake
 Constancia Lake
 del Las Rocas Lake
 Galletué Lake
 Gris Lake
 Huilipilún Lake
 Huishue Lake
 Icalma Lake
 Lanalhue Lake
 Llanquihue Lake
 Lleulleu Lake
 Maihue Lake
 Neltume Lake
 Laguna Verde
 Panguipulli Lake
 Pellaifa Lake
 Pirihueico Lake
 Pullinque Lake
 Puyehue Lake
 Riñihue Lake
 Ranco Lake
 Rupanco Lake
 Tagua Tagua Lake
 Tinquilco Lake
 Todos los Santos Lake
 Villarrica Lake

Lakes in Zona Austral
 Azul Lake
 Blanco Lake
 Chaiguata Lake
 Caro Lake
 Chico Lake
 Cochrane Lake (in Chile and Argentina)
 Copa Lake
 Cucao Lake
 Del Toro Lake
 Dickson Lake
 El Parrillar Lake
 Espolón Lake
 Fagnano Lake (in Chile and Argentina)
 Geike Lake
 General Carrera Lake (in Chile and Argentina)
 Greve Lake
 Grey Lake
 La Paloma Lake
 Laguna Blanca (Chile)
 Laguna Abascal
 Laguna San Rafael
 Laguna Verde
 Navarino Lake
 Nordenskiöld Lake
 O'Higgins Lake (in Chile and Argentina)
 Palena Lake (in Chile and Argentina)
 Pehoe Lake
 Pilushejan Lake
 Pingo Lake
 Presidente Rios Lake
 Reñihue Lake
 Roosevelt Lake
 Sarmiento Lake
 Windhond Lake
 Yelcho Lake
 Yulton Lake

See also

List of lakes
List of rivers of Chile
List of volcanoes in Chile

External links 
PatagoniaChile - Hidrografía de Aysén

Chile
Lakes